Shipka  is peak in the central part of Balkan Mountains, east of Shipka Pass.

See also 
Battle of Shipka Pass

References 

Balkan mountains